Leon Kroll (December 6, 1884 – October 25, 1974) was an American painter and lithographer. A figurative artist described by Life magazine as "the dean of U.S. nude painters", he was also a landscape painter and also produced an exceptional body of still life compositions. His public art includes murals for the Department of Justice Building in Washington, D.C. He created his only mosaic for the chapel ceiling at Normandy American Cemetery and Memorial.

Biography
Leon Kroll was born into a musical family on lower Second Avenue in New York City. His father was a violinist, and his cousin was composer William Kroll. He studied at the Art Students League of New York under John Henry Twachtman, and at the Académie Julian in Paris with Jean Paul Laurens in the late 1800s.

In 1911 and 1912, he showed in the group exhibition of The Independents initiated by Robert Henri at the MacDowell Club in New York. "It was a self chosen group:  you had to be elected by the other ten. Hopper was in it and Speicher, John Sloan as well as Henri, Glackens and Luks - It was a very good group of the best artists" said Kroll.

In 1913 Kroll showed work at the Armory Show.

In addition to his own work, Kroll taught at the Art Students League of New York and the school of the National Academy of Design, where he had his first solo exhibition in 1910, was named as Associate in 1920 and as full Academician in 1927. Kroll also taught advertising and poster design at Cooper Union from 1926-1930. In 1930, he was elected to the American Academy of Arts and Letters. He was also named Chevalier of the Legion of Honor in 1950. Kroll died in Gloucester, Massachusetts aged 89.

Artist-writer Jerome Myers in his autobiography Artist In Manhattan said:

Work 
Among Kroll's major public works are murals at these locations:
 Department of Justice Building, 1935
 Worcester Memorial Auditorium, Worcester, Massachusetts, 1938–1942
 Senate chamber murals for the Indiana Statehouse, with farm figures described by critics as "Bolsheviks", 1952 (destroyed 1970s)
 Shriver Hall at Johns Hopkins University, circa 1953
 Normandy American Cemetery near Colleville-sur-Mer, France, 1953, his only mosaic

References 

Leeds, Valerie Ann. Leon Kroll Revisited. New York: Gerald Peters Gallery, 1998.

External links

 online biography
 another online biography
 Works at New Mexico Museum of Art

1884 births
1974 deaths
20th-century American painters
American male painters
American muralists
Art Students League of New York alumni
Chevaliers of the Légion d'honneur
American people of German descent
Art Students League of New York faculty
Members of the American Academy of Arts and Letters
Section of Painting and Sculpture artists
20th-century American male artists